Pavčina Lehota ( or ) is a village and municipality in Liptovský Mikuláš District in the Žilina Region of northern Slovakia. The village is known mainly for tourism because of its location among the famous attractions of large caves, aqua parks, ski resorts that surrounds the village.

Surroundings of the village

Location 
The village is located in the center of year-round tourism region Liptov right between the aqua-park Tatralandia and Jasna ski-resort in the northern part of the Low Tatras. It is therefore starting point for sports and tourism in Demänovská valley and ski resort Jasná dominated by peak Chopok (2024 metres a.s.l.) as well as the Low Tatras National Park. The village Pavčina Lehota is approximately 7 km distant from the city Liptovský Mikuláš.

Skiing 
There are several ski resorts near Pavčina Lehota:
  Ski resort Jasná (the largest ski resort in Slovakia)
  Ski resort Žiarce (ski resort for pre-intermediate skiers)
  Ski resort Demänova (ski resort for beginners)

Aqua-parks and Spa 
In the vicinity of Pavčina Lehota there are several water amusement and relaxation parks with thermal water
 Aquapark Tatralandia (the largest water park with the most water slides and water attractions in Slovakia)
 Aquapark Bešeňová (aquapark with red thermal water)
 Spa Lúčky

Caves 
Demänovská Valley itself is widely known for extensive karst formations - especially the Cave of Liberty and the Ice Cave. The cave system in Demänovská Valley is opened to public and it includes about 30 caves that have been discovered so far including:

 Demänovská Cave of Freedom (most visited cave in Slovakia)
 Demänovská Ice Cave 
 Cave of dead bats (Speleo hiking in cave terrain at the altitude of 1,750 m a.s.l.)
 Stanišovská cave

Hiking around the village 

  Low Tatras National Park, which starts less than 500 meters from the village, offers a wide range of tourist opportunities:
  peak Chopok (2,024 m a.s.l.)
  peak Ďumbier (2,043 m a.s.l.)
  SNP trail along the ridge of the Low Tatras (762 km trail from south-west to north-east of Slovakia)
  Stefanik mountain cottage (1,740 m a.s.l.)
  Vrbicke Lake (1,113 m a.s.l.)
  Educational trail Around Pavčina Lehota  (hiking, cross-country skiing, cycling)
Around the village there is a 10 km long educational trail with vertical elevation of 100 metres. This trail consists of 11 information and educational boards and few points of interests such as: ski and bobsleigh area Žiarce, lookout tower, geocaching cabinets, covered seating with fireplace toasting and places with unusual views. The nature trail will guide you through the fauna, flora, history and attractions of Pavčina Lehota.

  Nature hiking trail "The story of water" Demänovská Valley  (hiking)

The nature hiking trail in Demänovská Valley is only 1 km away from the village and winds along the River Demänovka. Educational boards visualize a map of more than 42 km long 9-storey cave labyrinth, as well as the fauna and flora of important protected areas of Demänovská valley. The Demänovský cave system is the longest cave system in Slovakia. The nature trail passes along the most well-known caves of Demänovská Valley: Demänovská Cave of Freedom and Demänovská Ice Cave

Other tourist attractions around Pavčina Lehota 

 Alpine Bobsleigh track and fun park Žiarce
  Downhill cycling  - Jasná
 Open-air museum  Vlkolínec 
 Open-air museum of Liptov village Pribylina
 Downhill on scooters through  Žiarska valley in the West Tatras or in  Jánska valley  in Low Tatras
 Outdoor natural climbing wall Machnatô
  Western city - Tatralandia
  Indoor skydiving in the wind tunnel - Tatralandia
 Indoor surfing - Tatralandia
  Contact zoo  - Tatralandia
  Miniatures park  and Park of sculptures made of sand - Liptovský Ján

History 
According to historical records the village was first mentioned in 1365. First settlement was discovered on the peak of Low Tatras called Jama (limestone plateau 1438 metres a.s.l.). In the course of later activities historians documented attempts to build at this place.

Monuments 
Village has ancient rustic bell tower from 1883. Located in the area of the local cemetery. It was modified in 1924. The wooden square single-room building has a tapered superstructure with a tent roof covered with shingles. Its copy is located in the Museum of the Liptov village in Pribylina.

Geography 
The municipality lies at an altitude of 698 metres a.s.l. and covers an area of 7.217 km². It has a population of about 350 people.

External links 
 https://web.archive.org/web/20080111223415/http://www.statistics.sk/mosmis/eng/run.html 

Villages and municipalities in Liptovský Mikuláš District